Katigorah Assembly constituency is one of the 126 assembly constituencies in Cachar district in the North-East Indian state of Assam. Kalain is main town of Katigorah.
Katigorah Assembly constituency is part of No. 2 Silchar Lok Sabha constituency and also the Subdivision of Cachar District.

Overview
As per orders of the Delimitation Commission, No. 15 Katigorah Assembly constituency is composed of Katigorah Police Station in Katigorah Subdivision.

Members of Legislative Assembly
Key

Election results

2016 results

2011 results

See also
 Katigorah
 List of constituencies of Assam Legislative Assembly

References

External links 
 

Assembly constituencies of Assam